The 1994 Hypo Group Tennis International was an ATP men's tennis tournament held on outdoor clay courts in St. Poelten, Austria that was part of the World Series of the 1994 ATP Tour. It was the 14th edition of the tournament and was held from 13 June until 20 June 1994.

First-seeded Thomas Muster won the singles title, his third win at the event after 1988 and 1993.

Finals

Singles
 Thomas Muster defeated  Tomás Carbonell 4–6, 6–2, 6–4
 It was Muster's 3rd singles title of the year and the 23rd of his career.

Doubles
 Vojtech Flegl /  Andrew Florent defeated  Adam Malik /  Jeff Tarango 3–6, 6–1, 6–4

References

External links
 ITF tournament edition details

Hypo Group Tennis International
Hypo Group Tennis International
Hypo